Madeuplexia is a genus of moths of the family Noctuidae from Madagascar. The genus was erected by Pierre Viette in 1960.

Taxonomy
Some sources place this name as a synonym of Phlogophora Treitschke, 1825.

Species 
Madeuplexia altitudinis Viette, 1960
Madeuplexia camusi Viette, 1967
Madeuplexia pretiosa Viette, 1960
Madeuplexia retorta (Berio, 1956)
Madeuplexia sogai Viette, 1960

References

Acronictinae